John Findlay may refer to:

John Findlay (footballer) (died 1916), Scottish footballer
John Findlay (U.S. politician) (1766–1838), U.S. Representative from Pennsylvania
John Findlay (New Zealand politician) (1862–1929),  New Zealand politician of the Liberal Party
John M. Findlay, University of Washington faculty member, author, and editor of Pacific Northwest Quarterly
John Van Lear Findlay (1839–1907), U.S. Representative from Maryland
John Niemeyer Findlay (1903–1987), 20th century philosopher
John Ritchie Findlay (1824–1898), Scottish newspaper proprietor and philanthropist
Sir John Ritchie Findlay, 1st Baronet (1866–1930), Scottish newspaper proprietor and philanthropist, son of the above
John Walter Findlay (1866–1943), member of the Canadian House of Commons
Edmund Findlay (John Edmund Ritchie Findlay, 1902–1962), Scottish politician and MP for Banffshire, full name

See also 
Findlay baronets
John Finley (disambiguation)
John Finlay (disambiguation)